Benton Lake is a 5,600 acre wetland in the U.S. state of Montana, and within both the Benton Lake National Wildlife Refuge and the Benton Lake Wetland Management District.

Location and description 

The lake is in west-central Montana within both the Benton Lake National Wildlife Refuge and the Benton Lake Wetland Management District. Benton Lake is located approximately 3 miles north west of Black Horse Lake.

The lake is a 5,600 acre shallow wetland with no natural outlets. Water volumes vary seasonally.

History 
The lake was created during the Pleistocene glacial period.

The Benton Lake Wetland Management District was created in 1929.

Ecology 

The lake hosts waterbirds, especially dabbing ducks.

References 

Great Falls, Montana
Lakes of Montana
Bodies of water of Cascade County, Montana
Wetlands of Montana